Piotr Łabędzi (died 20 August 1198) was a Catholic Bishop of Poznań and Archbishop of Gniezno. He was commonly mistaken for his predecessor, the Blessed Bogumił (as Bogumił-Piotr), but recent studies classify them as two different people.
Łabędzi most likely came from the powerful Łabędzi family. Nothing is known about his life before consecration. A few years after becoming bishop, he was promoted to Archbishop of Gniezno.

References 

12th-century Roman Catholic bishops in Poland
1198 deaths
Year of birth missing

External links
 Virtual tour Gniezno Cathedral